Willie Potgieter (born 5 January 2002) is a South African rugby union player for the  in the Currie Cup. His regular position is lock, flanker or number 8.

Potgieter was named in the  side for the 2022 Currie Cup Premier Division.

References

South African rugby union players
Living people
Rugby union locks
Rugby union flankers
Rugby union number eights
Blue Bulls players
2002 births
Kobelco Kobe Steelers players